Zinaida Arsenyevna Kvachadze (25 September 1921, Batumi – 2005, Tbilisi) was a Soviet and Georgian politician. 

She was appointed Minister of Trade in 1957.

References

1921 births
2005 deaths
20th-century women politicians from Georgia (country)
People from Batumi
Government ministers of Georgia (country)
Recipients of the Order of Friendship of Peoples
Recipients of the Order of Honor (Georgia)
Recipients of the Order of Lenin
Recipients of the Order of the Red Banner of Labour